Borisovo is a rural locality (a village) in Chuchkovskoye Rural Settlement, Sokolsky District, Vologda Oblast, Russia. The population was 15 as of 2002.

Geography 
Borisovo is located 85 km northeast of Sokol (the district's administrative centre) by road. Starovo is the nearest rural locality.

References 

Rural localities in Sokolsky District, Vologda Oblast